Michael Calvey (born October 3, 1967) is an American businessman and one of Russia’s most prominent foreign investors. His criminal conviction on accusations of embezzlement in Russia caused widespread resonance.

Calvey is the co-founder of Baring Vostok, an independent private equity firm focused on investments in Russia and the Commonwealth of Independent States.

In February 2019, Calvey and five colleagues were arrested on suspicion of involvement in the theft of 2.5 billion rubles from Vostochny Bank. In August 2021, after nearly two years under house arrest, Calvey was found guilty of misappropriation and given a 5.5-year suspended sentence by a Moscow court.

Biography
Calvey was born in 1967 in Wisconsin and grew up in Oklahoma. He has Bachelor of Business degree from the University of Oklahoma and Master of Finance degree from the London School of Economics.

Calvey worked on mergers and acquisitions at Salomon Brothers and later managed the investment projects in Central and Eastern Europe and Soviet Union in the European Bank for Reconstruction and Development.

In an interview after his February 2019 arrest, Calvey revealed that his interest in Eastern Europe emerged after the collapse of the Berlin Wall in 1989. Calvey noted that the 1991 Soviet coup d'état attempt took place just a week before he started working in Russia.

Baring Vostok Capital Partners 
Calvey co-founded Baring Vostok in 1994, with the firm becoming known for making early-stage investments in Russian companies largely from the tech and consumer-facing sectors. As of 2019, Baring Vostok launched 6 funds totaling $3.7 billion. By 2021, the firm has reportedly invested almost $3 billion in 80 companies, including some of Russia’s most valuable technology companies such as Tinkoff Bank, Ozon, FGI Wireless (Beeline), CTC Media, Avito.ru, 1C Company, Ivi.ru, and CarPrice. In Russia, Baring Vostok was best knows for its investment in Yandex: the fund returned over $1 billion from the initial purchase of 35% share in 2020 for $5.28 million.

The New  York Times  described Calvey as a longstanding proponent of investment opportunities in Russia. Anatoly Chubais, a former Russian Deputy Prime Minister and a key figure in Russia’s post-Soviet market reforms, credited Calvey with personally attracting billions of dollars of investment into the country.  According to Bloomberg, "Calvey became a legend in the Russian market, in part because of his reputed aversion to any kind of foul play and focus on industries and companies unlikely to attract the attention of Russia’s authorities."

Baring Vostok embezzlement case 

Calvey was arrested on 14 February 2019, with three other Baring Vostok executives, on suspicion of allegedly embezzling 2.5 billion rubles (US$38 million) from the Russian Vostochny Bank. On 21 February, Russian state prosecutors formally charged him with fraud. The criminal case was initiated on the basis of a statement from Sherzod Yusupov, a minority shareholder of Vostochny Bank. As of February 2019, Calvey's Baring Vostok had a majority stake of 52.5% in Vostochny Bank.

Calvey claimed the allegations were unfounded and linked the criminal investigation against him to a corporate dispute he had with other shareholders of Vostochny Bank. Later the shareholders entered into a settlement agreement and publicly stated that their shareholder dispute was not related to the criminal investigation. After signing the settlement agreement, Baring Vostok returned 2.5 billion rubles to Vostochny Bank.

Calvey was held in Seaman's Silence Prison, the facility notorious for poor conditions and treatment — it is the same prison where lawyer Sergei Magnitsky was detained and died under mysterious circumstances. Likewise, Calvey's case was assigned to Arthur Karpov, the same judge who prosecuted Magnitsky. U.S. government officials under both the Trump and Biden administrations commented publicly that the case was a commercial dispute that shouldn’t be resolved in criminal courts, and that the arrest of Calvey was a major barrier to improving U.S.-Russian business relations.

In April 2019, Calvey was released to a restricted form of house arrest, although a number of colleagues remained in prison. It was reported that Putin had personally taken the case "under his control", though Putin acknowledged "the law is the law" implying he was not in control. House arrest was lifted in December 2020 and replaced with other restrictions.

In August 2021, Calvey was found guilty of misappropriating 2.5 billion rubles by the Meshchansky district court of Moscow. He was sentenced to 5.5 years of probation and did not go to jail. During the term of Calvey’s suspended sentence, he is allowed to travel but is required to register monthly with the Federal Penal Enforcement Service of Russia, and will not be allowed to change his permanent place of residence without informing Russian authorities. Calvey's colleagues were sentenced to between 42 and 60 months of probation. A couple of weeks after, Michael Calvey and his colleagues appealed the decision. 

Observers have called the sentence a victory under the circumstances, with sources including Russia’s business ombudsman Boris Titov saying the decision was an attempt by Russian law enforcement to “save face."

In January 2022 the appellate court lifted the Moscow Meshchansky district court home restriction. Calvey is now allowed to leave home and travel abroad.

Relatives 

Michael Calvey's elder brother Kevin Calvey is an Oklahoma Republican.

References 

1967 births
Living people
Alumni of the London School of Economics
American financial businesspeople